Eleanor P. Brown is an American economist. She is the James Irvine Professor of Economics at Pomona College in Claremont, California, and is a co-editor of the academic journal Review of Economics of the Household.

Early life and education
Eleanor Phyllis Brown was born on April 18, 1954. She attended public schools in Fullerton, California, before attending Pomona College, graduating in 1975. She then earned a Master's degree in 1977 and a doctorate in 1981 from Princeton University.

Career

After teaching at the University of Florida and Princeton University, Brown returned to Pomona College, her alma mater, in 1986, where she currently holds the James Irvine chair in economics. 

Her research focuses on economic activity outside the quid pro quo of the market, including charitable giving and volunteering, the economics of the nonprofit sector and the economics of the family. After serving for many years as its Secretary and conference program chair, she was elected President of the Association for the Study of the Grants Economy and presided over its name change to the Association for the Study of Generosity in Economics. She served as deputy editor of Nonprofit and Voluntary Sector Quarterly 1998-2010 and as coeditor of Review of Economics of the Household 2012-2022.

References

External links
Faculty page at Pomona College

Year of birth missing (living people)
Living people
Pomona College faculty
American economists
Pomona College alumni
Princeton University alumni